The Martin Ridge Cave System is a large cave near Mammoth Cave, in the U.S. state of Kentucky.

Discovery

The original entrance to the system, Whigpistle Cave, was discovered by Rick Schwartz in 1976. Mapping was initiated by the National Park Service under the supervision of park hydrologist Jim Quinlan in an effort to better understand the hydrology of Mammoth Cave's watershed.

Significance

The cave also contains what is likely the largest cave chamber in Kentucky, the Big Womb. The cave possesses an intimate hydrologic connection with nearby Mammoth Cave. Groundwater dye tracing has shown that water flowing from Mammoth Cave's Hawkins River emerges downstream at a river within Martin Ridge Cave. The unexplored section between Mammoth Cave and the Martin Ridge Cave System is underwater and will require cave diving to determine whether a traversable physical connection is possible.

Connections

In 1994, explorers from the James Cave Project discovered Jackpot Cave to the east of the Whigpistle entrance. Their efforts mapped over three miles (5 km) of new cave.

In 1996, Western Kentucky University graduate students Alan Glennon and Jon Jasper discovered a new entrance and eight miles (12.5 km) of cave passage. Their exploration revealed connections to Jackpot in June 1996 and Whigpistle in August 1996.

Current exploration

Efforts continue to explore and map the cave. The Martin Ridge Cave System is separated from Mammoth Cave by a deep valley, though a human connection may be possible at the caves' lowest elevation passageways. Currently, at least a one-kilometer (3,300-foot) gap exists between the two caves' closest known reaches.

See also
 List of caves in the United States

Footnotes

References

 Glennon, J.A. (2001). "Narrative of the Exploration and Survey of the Martin Ridge Cave System, Edmonson County, Kentucky" from Application of Morphometric Relationships to Active Flow Networks within the Mammoth Cave Watershed, M.Sc. Thesis, Bowling Green: Western Kentucky University, 87 p.
 Groves, C.G. (1998). The Martin Ridge Cave System, Cave Research Foundation Newsletter.
 Taylor, R.L. (1979). Discovery in Whigpistle Cave, Kentucky, The Ozarks' Underground, vol. 1, pp. 4–7.

Caves of Kentucky
Landforms of Edmonson County, Kentucky
Wild caves